The Journal of Traditional Chinese Medicine was the first English-language journal on the subject of traditional Chinese medicine, including acupuncture, herbal medicine, homeopathy, massotherapy, mind-body therapies, palliative care and other topics in complementary and alternative medicine.

The journal was original established in Chinese as Chung i tsa chih ying wen pan in 1955. The English edition of the Journal of Traditional Chinese Medicine was first published in 1981. It is jointly sponsored and published by the China Association of Chinese Medicine and the China Academy of Chinese Medical Sciences. Its headquarters are in Beijing. The journal is also published in German, Italian, Spanish, French and Portuguese editions.

Abstracting and indexing
The journal is abstracted and indexed in the following bibliographic databases:
EMBASE
MEDLINE
Science Citation Index Expanded
Scopus

References

External links

 Website of the Journal of Traditional Chinese Medicine
 Website of JTCM on Elsevier
 Acupuncture Case Histories from China, by Jirui Chen and Nissi Wang (Eastland Press, 2005).

Alternative and traditional medicine journals
Traditional Chinese medicine
Acupuncture
Pseudoscience
Publications established in 1955
Bimonthly journals

Open access journals